The Fortune Hunter is a lost 1914 silent film directed by Barry O'Neil. It stars actor William Elliott and Ethel Clayton. The Lubin Manufacturing Company produced.

This play was an early stage success for Jack Barrymore in 1909.

Cast
William Elliott - Nat Duncan
George Soule Spencer - Harry Kellogg
Charles Brandt - Sam Graham
Ethel Clayton - Betty Graham
Betty Brice - Josie Lockwood  (*as Rosetta Brice)
Joseph Kaufman - Roland Barrett
Florence Williams -Mrs. Lockwood
James Daly - Blinky Lockwood
Gaston Bell - Willie Bartlett
Ruth Bryan - Angie Smith
Frank Backus - Pete Willing
Clara Lambert - Mrs. Willing
Alan Quinn - Tracy Tenner
Ferdinand Tidmarsh - George Burnham
Edwin Barbour - Old Hi

References

External links

1914 films
American silent feature films
Lost American films
Lubin Manufacturing Company films
American films based on plays
American black-and-white films
Films directed by Barry O'Neil
1910s American films
Silent American comedy films